Prof. Basudev Chatterji (1949–8 June 2017) was a historian, writer and professor of History at the University of Delhi. He also held a position of Reader at the University of Hyderabad and a visiting professorship of history at the Indian Institute of Technology, Guwahati. He was the 20th chair person of the Indian Council of Historical Research from 20 May 2011 – 19 May 2014.

Early education 

 Bachelor Of Arts 1968, St Stephens College, Delhi; Post-graduate 1970, St Stephens College, Delhi; PhD (History) 1978, The University of Cambridge.

Career 
He was a recipient of the commonwealth scholarship award for 1973–78. He attended the University of Cambridge from 1973–78 and received his PhD in 1978 in history. He was one of 24 scholars who advised the University of Cambridge on strategic engagement with India as part of the Vice-Chancellor's Circle of Advisors.

He was a sitar player, having been trained by Pandit Uma Shankar Mishra, who was himself a disciple of Pandit Ravi Shankar.

He has published several books including "Towards Freedom: Documents on the Movement for Independence in India" and "Trade, Tariffs and Empire: Lancashire and British Policy in India, 1919–1939".

References 

1949 births
2017 deaths
20th-century Indian historians
St. Stephen's College, Delhi alumni